Reliance Petroleum is an Indian petroleum company that specializes in oil and energy, owned by Mukesh Ambani of Reliance Industries Limited (RIL), one of India's largest private sector companies. It is based in Ahmedabad, Gujarat, India and has interests in the downstream oil business. RPL was merged with Reliance Industries Limited on 29 September 2009. 

Reliance Petroleum and RIL own / have long term chartered two oil rigs – DD KG-1 and DD KG-2 (DD standing for Dhirubhai Deepwater). They are both drilling ships registered in Marshall Islands and owned by Deepwater Pacific Inc., a subsidiary of Transocean.

Jamnagar Refinery

It will have a complexity of 21.0, using the Nelson Complexity Index, ranking it one of the highest in the sector. The polypropylene plant will have a capacity to produce 0.9 million metric tonnes per annum.

The refinery project is being implemented at a capital cost of Rs 270,000 million being funded through a mix of equity and debt. This represents a capital cost of less than US$10,000 per barrel per day and compares very favourably with the average capital cost of new refineries announced in recent years. The International Energy Agency (IEA) estimates the average capital cost of new refinery in the OECD nations to be in the region of US$15,000 to 20,000 per barrel per day. The low capital cost of RPL becomes even more attractive when adjusted for high complexity of the refinery.

Controversies
In 2012, reports surfaced in the media highlighting the fact that ONGC had chartered an oil rig owned by RIL in May 2009 (Dhirubhai Deepwater KG-1, also known as DDKG-1) without taking bids from any other companies. This was revealed in the report published by the Comptroller and Auditor General of India (CAG), the overseer of expenditures of the Indian Government. RIL also owed ONGC Rs. 92,000 crores, which were already overdue by 2 years at that time. However, as of 2018, this outstanding amount was still not paid to ONGC by RIL.

References

External links

Oil and gas companies of India
Companies based in Ahmedabad
Energy companies established in 2008
Reliance Industries subsidiaries
Reliance Industries
Indian companies established in 2008
2008 establishments in Gujarat